Alminoprofen is a non-steroidal anti-inflammatory drug.

References 

Anilines
Propionic acids
Alkene derivatives